Kh. Badar Uddin is a Bangladesh Nationalist Party politician and the former Member of Parliament of Tangail-7.

Career
Uddin was elected to parliament from Tangail-7 as a Bangladesh Nationalist Party candidate in 1991.

References

Bangladesh Nationalist Party politicians
Living people
5th Jatiya Sangsad members
Year of birth missing (living people)